Salman Al-Azami is a British-Bangladeshi author and academic at Liverpool Hope University, where he is a senior lecturer in English language. He obtained his BA, MA, and PhD at Aligarh Muslim University in India. He is the son of Prof Ghulam Azam.

Publications 
Dr Al-Azami is the author a number of works including Religion in the Media: A Linguistic Analysis, published by Palgrave Macmillan.

He frequently publishes articles on matters pertaining to religion, media, and his native Bangladesh, in a variety of online media outlets including The Huffington Post, OpenDemocracy and Anadolu Agency. He has also published several academic articles.

References

Academics of Liverpool Hope University
Living people
British Muslims
Linguists of English
Bangladeshi academics
Aligarh Muslim University alumni
Year of birth missing (living people)
Bangladeshi expatriates in the United Kingdom